The Concerto pour orgue, cordes et timbales (Concerto for organ, timpani and strings) in G minor, FP 93, is an organ concerto composed by Francis Poulenc between 1934 and 1938. It has become one of the most frequently performed pieces of the genre not written in the Baroque period.

History of composition
The organ concerto was commissioned by Princess Edmond de Polignac in 1934, as a piece with a chamber orchestra accompaniment and an easy organ part that the princess could probably play herself. The commission was originally given to Jean Françaix, who declined, but Poulenc accepted. Poulenc quickly abandoned this idea for something much more grandiose and ambitious; his earlier harpsichord concerto and double-piano concerto were simpler, more light-hearted pieces. As he wrote in a letter to Françaix, "The concerto...is not the amusing Poulenc of the Concerto for two pianos, but more like a Poulenc en route for the cloister." The death of a colleague and friend, the young critic and composer Pierre-Octave Ferroud, in the spring of 1936 made Poulenc go on a pilgrimage to the Black Virgin of Rocamadour, where he rediscovered his Christian faith. This new religious conviction not only nurtured an interest in religious music, which he began to compose, but also highly influenced his incomplete Organ Concerto. Indeed, Poulenc referred to it as being on the fringe of his religious works. Poulenc himself had never actually composed for the organ before, and so he studied great baroque masterpieces for the instrument by Johann Sebastian Bach and Dieterich Buxtehude; the work's neo-baroque feel reflects this. Poulenc was also advised about the instrument's registration and other aspects by the organist Maurice Duruflé. Duruflé was also the soloist in the private premiere of the work on 16 December 1938, with Nadia Boulanger conducting, at Princess Edmond's salon. The first public performance was in June 1939 at the Salle Gaveau in Paris, with Duruflé once again the soloist and Roger Désormière conducting.

Instrumentation
As the full title of the piece denotes, the piece is scored for a solo organ, timpani and a string orchestra. The piece uses such comparatively small forces, relative to Poulenc's other concertos (the Concert champêtre used a full orchestra as accompaniment), so that the piece could be played in a quite small space with an organ, such as Princess Edmond's salon, that were quite popular in France at the time. The piece would have been premiered on a Cavaillé-Coll instrument, as the company supplied many organs to private customers, one of whom was the princess.

Analysis
The piece is just over 20 minutes in duration and consists of a single continuous movement with seven tempo marks. Respectively, these are: Andante, Allegro giocoso, Subito andante moderato, Tempo allegro. Molto agitato, Très calme: Lent, Tempo de l'allegro initial and Tempo d'introduction: Largo. Each movement often differs substantially in style, tone and texture. For example, the opening movements are loud and quite violent, with substantial organ chords; yet the following middle movements are much calmer and softer.

Selected Recordings

Notes

References

Bibliography 
 

Compositions by Francis Poulenc
Poulenc
1938 compositions